The 2016 Australian Swimming Championships were held from 7 to 14 April 2016 at the South Australia Aquatic and Leisure Centre in Adelaide, South Australia. They doubled up as the national trials for the 2016 Summer Olympics and the 2016 Summer Paralympics in Rio de Janeiro, Brazil.

Events
A total of 65 events (32 for men, 32 for women and 1 mixed event) were contested. For able bodies swimmers these consisted of:
Freestyle: 50, 100, 200, 400, 800, and 1,500;
Backstroke: 50, 100 and 200;
Breaststroke: 50, 100 and 200;
Butterfly: 50, 100 and 200;
Individual medley: 200 and 400;
Relays: 4×100 free, 4×200 free; 4×100 medley

For para-swimmers these consisted of:
Freestyle: 50, 100, 200 and 400;
Backstroke: 50 and 100;
Breaststroke: 50 and 100;
Butterfly: 50 and 100;
Individual medley: 150 (mixed) and 200;
Relays: 4×50 free

Schedule

M = Morning session, E = Evening session

Qualification criteria

Below are the entry qualifying times for each event that had to be achieved after 1 January 2015 in a 50m pool.

Below are the FINA A and B qualifying times for the 2016 Summer Olympics for each event. The A standard times were the times of those who finished 16th in the heats in each event at the London Olympics. The B standard times is an increase of 3.5% of the A times.

Below are the qualifying times set by Swimming Australia for the 2016 Summer Olympics for each event. They are the times of those who finished 8th in the semifinals of the 50, 100 and 200 metre events and 8th in the heats of the 400, 800, 1500 metre events at the 2015 World Aquatics Championships.

Below are the men's entry multiclass qualifying times for each event.

Below are the women's entry multiclass qualifying times for each event.

Below are the IPC minimum qualification standard (MQS) and minimum entry times (MET) for the 2016 Paralympic Games for each event.

Medal winners
The results are below.

Men's events

Men's multiclass events

Women's events

Women's multiclass events

Mixed multiclass events

Legend:

Records broken
During the 2016 Australian Swimming Championships the following records were set.

World records
 Men's 50 m backstroke S11 – Jeremy McClure, Canning Lightning (32.22) (final)
 Men's 50 m butterfly S14 – Mitchell Kilduff, MLC Marlins (27.00) (final)
 Women's 50 metre freestyle S9 – Ellie Cole, Castle Hill RSL (28.75) (final)
 Women's 50 metre breaststroke SB6 – Tiffany Thomas Kane, Ravenswood (43.06) (final)

World Junior records
 Men's 100 m freestyle – Kyle Chalmers, Marion (48.03) (final)

Commonwealth, Oceanian and Australian records
 Men's 100 m freestyle – Cameron McEvoy, Bond University (47.04) (final)
 Women's 50 m freestyle – Cate Campbell, Commercial (23.93) (semis)
 Women's 50 m freestyle – Cate Campbell, Commercial (23.84) (final)
 Women's 200 m freestyle – Emma McKeon, St Peters Western (1:54.83) (final)

Australian club records
 Women's 4 × 100 m medley relay – Madison Wilson, Georgia Bohl, Madeline Groves, Emma McKeon, St Peters Western (3:57.34) (final)

All Comers records
 Men's 100 m freestyle – Cameron McEvoy, Bond University (47.04) (final)
 Men's 1500 m freestyle – Mack Horton, Melbourne Vicentre (14:39.54) (final)
 Men's 100 m backstroke – Mitch Larkin, St Peters Western (52.48) (semis)
 Men's 4 × 100 m freestyle relay – James Roberts, Kyle Chalmers, James Magnussen, Cameron McEvoy, Australia A (3:12.26) (time trial)
 Women's 50 m freestyle – Cate Campbell, Commercial (23.93) (semis)
 Women's 50 m freestyle – Cate Campbell, Commercial (23.84) (final)
 Women's 100 m freestyle – Cate Campbell, Commercial (52.41) (semis)
 Women's 100 m freestyle – Cate Campbell, Commercial (52.38) (final)
 Women's 200 m freestyle – Emma McKeon, St Peters Western (1:54.83) (final)
 Women's 200 m backstroke – Belinda Hocking, Nunawading (2:06.49) (final)

Championship records
 Men's 100 m freestyle – Cameron McEvoy, Bond University (47.04) (final)
 Men's 1500 m freestyle – Mack Horton, Melbourne Vicentre (14:39.54) (final)
 Men's 100 m backstroke – Mitch Larkin, St Peters Western (52.48) (semis)
 Men's 200 m backstroke – Mitch Larkin, St Peters Western (1:54.68) (semis)
 Men's 200 m backstroke – Mitch Larkin, St Peters Western (1:53.90) (final)
 Women's 50 m freestyle – Cate Campbell, Commercial (23.93) (semis)
 Women's 50 m freestyle – Cate Campbell, Commercial (23.84) (final)
 Women's 100 m freestyle – Cate Campbell, Commercial (52.41) (semis)
 Women's 100 m freestyle – Cate Campbell, Commercial (52.38) (final)
 Women's 200 m freestyle – Emma McKeon, St Peters Western (1:54.83) (final)
 Women's 800 m freestyle – Jessica Ashwood, Chandler (8:18.42) (final)
 Women's 100 m backstroke – Emily Seebohm, Brisbane Grammar (58.73) (final) 
 Women's 200 m backstroke – Belinda Hocking, Nunawading (2:06.49) (final)

Papua New Guinean records
 Men's 50 m backstroke – Ryan Pini, 25.62 (heat)
 Men's 50 m backstroke – Ryan Pini, 25.55 (final)
 Men's 50 m butterfly – Ryan Pini, 23.67 (heat)
 Men's 50 m butterfly – Ryan Pini, 23.67 (final)

Olympic and Paralympic teams
On 13 April 2016, the team for the 2016 Paralympic Games was announced. 31 members were named with the remaining five to be announced in the coming months. The following day, the team for the 2016 Summer Olympics was announced. 34 members were named with 21 of them making their Olympic debut. On 7 June it was announced that James Roberts, James Magnussen and Matthew Abood had also made the squad as members of the 4 × 100 men's freestyle relay team. With Australia finishing outside the top 12 at the 2015 World Championships, the trio had to wait until FINA finalised their rankings on 31 May.

Club points scores
The final club point scores are below. Note: Only the top ten clubs are listed.

Note: Unattached swimmers in Queensland finished with 167 points.

Broadcast
The morning sessions were streamed live on the website of Swimming Australia. The evening sessions were broadcast live on Channel Seven. This was the first national championships to be screen by Seven after securing the broadcast rights with Swimming Australia in September 2015. The deal is for the next five years with the option to extend for a further four years through until 2025.

Notes

References

Swimming Championships
Australian championships
Australian Swimming Championships
Sports competitions in Adelaide
Australian championships
2010s in Adelaide
April 2016 sports events in Australia